Suzanne Fisher Staples is an American writer of children's books.

Early life and education
Born in Philadelphia, Staples grew up in northeastern Pennsylvania, in the United States. She had three siblings, a sister and two brothers. 

Suzanne attended Lakeland High School in Jermyn, Pennsylvania and graduated from Cedar Crest College in Allentown, Pennsylvania.

Career
Staples was a news reporter and editor at United Press International, working from many locations in the U.S. and Asia, including Pakistan.

Books

 1989: Shabanu, Daughter of the Wind – A story about a girl living in Pakistan who struggles with tradition. 
 1993: Haveli – A sequel to Shabanu, the girl's struggle continues as she must cope with the jealousy and spite of her husband's other wives.
 1996: Dangerous Skies – Two children struggle to hold their friendship together.
 2000: Shiva's Fire – A girl in India learns to use her magic wisely.
 2003: The Green Dog – A warm story about the author's childhood.
 2005: Under the Persimmon Tree – An Afghan refugee and an American teacher are brought together.
 2008: The House of Djinn – a sequel to Shabanu and Haveli, taking place ten years after the events in Haveli''.

See also

References

External links

 Suzanne  at Library of Congress Authorities — with 9 catalog records

Living people
Place of birth missing (living people)
Cedar Crest College alumni
American children's writers
Newbery Honor winners
20th-century American writers
Writers from Philadelphia
1945 births
20th-century American women writers
21st-century American women